Events in the year 1862 in Portugal.

Incumbents
Monarch: Louis I
Prime Minister: Nuno José Severo de Mendoça Rolim de Moura Barreto, 1st Duke of Loulé

Events

Arts and entertainment

Sports

Births

19 May – João do Canto e Castro, naval officer and politician (died 1934)
28 November –  Infanta Maria Antonia of Portugal (d. 1959)

Deaths

28 December – Joaquim Casimiro, composer and organist (b. 1808).

References

 
1860s in Portugal
Portugal
Years of the 19th century in Portugal
Portugal